Kallithea is an Aromanian (Vlach) village and a community of the Grevena municipality. Before the 2011 local government reform it was a part of the municipality of Gorgiani, of which it was a municipal district. The 2011 census recorded 58 residents in the village and 122 inhabitants in the community. The community of Kallithea covers an area of 49.987 km2.

Administrative division
The community of Kallithea consists of two separate settlements: 
Kallithea (population 58)
Prionia (population 64)
The aforementioned population figures are as of 2011.

See also
List of settlements in the Grevena regional unit

References

Populated places in Grevena (regional unit)
Aromanian settlements in Greece